Tony Ekubia (born 6 March 1960) is a Nigerian/British professional light/light welter/welterweight boxer of the 1980s and '90s who won the British Boxing Board of Control (BBBofC) Central (England) Area lightweight title, BBBofC British light welterweight title, and Commonwealth light welterweight title, his professional fighting weight varied from , i.e. lightweight to , i.e. welterweight.

References

External links

1960 births
Lightweight boxers
Light-welterweight boxers
Nigerian male boxers
Place of birth missing (living people)
Boxers from Manchester
Welterweight boxers
Living people
British male boxers